Italian Left (SI) is a left-wing political party in Italy. SI was launched in November 2015 as a parliamentary group in the Chamber of Deputies (full name: Italian Left – Left Ecology Freedom), including Left Ecology Freedom (SEL), dissidents from the Democratic Party like Future to the Left, and splinters from the Five Star Movement. At its launch, SI included 32 deputies, who were soon followed by 8 senators (who formed a sub-group within the Mixed Group of the Senate in February 2016), and 2 MEPs. SI was officially formed as a full-fledged party in February 2017, after SEL had chosen to merge into it in December 2016.

The party is led by Nicola Fratoianni. Notable founding members included Nichi Vendola (former leader of SEL), Loredana De Petris, Stefano Fassina, and Sergio Cofferati. In the aftermath of its founding congress, 18 deputies left the party, leaving it with 13 deputies, 8 senators and 2 MEPs: 17 deputies, led by former group leader Arturo Scotto, joined the brand-new Article One, while Laura Boldrini (President of the Chamber of Deputies) joined the Chamber's Mixed Group. In late 2017, the party was a founding member of Free and Equal, a left-wing joint list for the 2018 general election, and more recently in 2022 founded the Greens and Left Alliance (AVS) with Green Europe.

History

Background
In June 2015, Stefano Fassina, a former deputy minister in the Letta Cabinet, left the Democratic Party (PD) over disagreements with Matteo Renzi, then PD leader and Prime Minister. In doing this he was followed by his long-time ally . In July, during a convention, Fassina launched Future to the Left (FaS), an incubator of a new left-leaning party, with other movements and breakaway groups such as Possible (Pos) and Left Ecology Freedom (SEL).

In November, one senator (Corradino Mineo) and three more deputies (and ) left the party in protest against Renzi. D'Attorre, who holds a doctorate in philosophy from the Sant'Anna School of Advanced Studies, wrote a manifesto for a new "labour" party, which was signed also by the other five MPs and, which read: "The genetic mutation of the PD, born as central force of the Italian centre-left, is unfortunately already completed. The Renzi experience and the introduced mutations won't be a parenthesis. They have already altered in a irreversible way the perception of the PD and its function in the collective imagination". Subsequently, a parliamentary group under the banner of Italian Left was formed in the Chamber of Deputies, whose core was formed by SEL.

Formation of the party

In February 2016, SI held its constituent assembly in Rome. Consequently, SI was established as a sub-group within the Mixed Group in the Senate: five senators of SEL, two dissidents from the Five Star Movement ( and ) and one former Democrat (Mineo) joined, while two SEL senators (including Sardinian nationalist ) refused to join and left their party altogether.

Several lists named after SI participated in the 2016 local elections. The party did particularly well in Sesto Fiorentino, a medium-sized city in the metropolitan area of Florence, where it won 17.5% of the vote and its candidate for mayor was elected in the run-off with 65.5%, by beating his Democratic opponent.

In December 2016, SEL was dissolved, to merge it into SI in early 2017.

In February 2017, SI was officially formed and Nicola Fratoianni was elected as its first secretary.

Contextually, SI leader in the Chamber of Deputies Arturo Scotto (who was originally a candidate for the leadership Massimiliano Smeriglio), D'Attorre, Galli and Folino led a splinter group into the Article One – Democratic and Progressive Movement (MDP), a party formed by left-wing splinters of the PD.

In March 2017, SI welcomed the four deputies of Possible (Pos) in its group in the Chamber. In April, Campanella left the party.

On 24 June 2017, SI was accepted into the Party of the European Left as an observer member.

Free and Equal coalition
On 3 December 2017, SI established Free and Equal (LeU), a left-wing joint list for the 2018 general election, together with the MDP and Possible, and chose the President of the Senate and former anti-Mafia prosecutor Pietro Grasso as its leader and candidate for Prime Minister.

In the election, SI obtained three deputies (Fratoianni, Fassina and ) and one senator (De Petris).

In October, SI focused on forming an alliance with Luigi de Magistris' Popular Coalition for the 2019 European Parliament election, and broke with the MDP and LeU.

In January 2019, after the MDP's departure, SI returned into LeU's fold and, under the leadership of senator Francesco Laforgia and deputy Luca Pastorino (dissenting members of the MDP and Possible, respectively), the two organisations initiated a collaboration with the goal of forming a joint party at some point.

For the 2019 European Parliament election SI formed a joint list named The Left with the Communist Refoundation Party and other left-wing and far-left groups. The list obtained a mere 1.8% of the vote, leading Fratoianni to resign from secretary of SI.

In and out of government
In August 2019, tensions grew within the coalition supporting the government, leading to the issuing of a motion of no-confidence by the League. During the following government crisis, the M5S and the PD agreed to form a new cabinet together, under outgoing Prime Minister Giuseppe Conte. SI, along with the MDP and the entire LeU, joined Conte's second government, in which SI's  was appointed undersecretary of University.

In January 2021 Fratoianni was re-elected secretary of the party during an online congress.

In February, after the collapse of the government led by Conte, Mario Draghi was sworn in at the head of a government comprising the main parties of the centre-left and the centre-right. Fratoianni voiced concerns over SI's participation in the government and the party's national assembly voted against the cabinet. However, two out of three MPs, senator De Petris and deputy Palazzotto, announced their intention to vote in favour anyway, splitting the party. Subsequently, Palazzotto left the party.

2022 general election
In January 2022, SI and Green Europe (EV) formed a "consultation pact", aimed at co-operating on the 2022 Italian presidential election held in late January. In that context, the two parties decided to jointly support Luigi Manconi, a former lawmaker for the Federation of the Greens, the Democrats of the Left, and the Democratic Party (PD) and expert on human rights issues. In June 2022, SI's national assembly formally approved the alliance with EV.

In July 2022, SI and EV held a joint convention in Rome named "New Energies", promoting their cooperation and a unitary electoral program. The alliance deliberately took inspiration from the New Ecologic and Social People's Union, the left-wing list formed in the run-up of the 2022 French legislative election. Following the fall of Draghi's government, the early dissolution of the Italian Parliament and the calling of the 2022 general election, the AVS was officially launched and its logo presented. On 6 August 2022, the alliance formalised an electoral agreement with the PD.

Composition
The party's founding members were:

Along these, some youth organisations (including ACT! Agire Costruire Trasformare and TILT), local groups and individuals have joined SI.

Ideology
SI's ideology is a mix of democratic socialism, social democracy, and anti-austerity stances. In his manifesto, D'Attorre wrote that the new party would need to "go beyond the separation between reformists and radicals" and later explained that SI would be Keynesian and opposed to neoliberalism. The coalition's economics adviser is Joseph Stiglitz, a well-known American economist and winner of the Nobel Prize in economics, who had already been involved with Syriza in Greece, Podemos in Spain, and the Labour Party under Jeremy Corbyn in the United Kingdom. Fassina has also proposed a "controlled disintegration of the Eurozone".

Electoral results

Italian Parliament

European Parliament

Regional Councils

Leadership
Secretary: Nicola Fratoianni (2017–2019), Claudio Grassi (acting, 2019–2021), Nicola Fratoianni (2021–present)
President: Laura Lauri (2017–2019), Claudio Grassi (2019–2022), Maria Gabriella Branca (2022–present)
Coordinator: Elisabetta Piccolotti (2021–present)
Party Leader in the Chamber of Deputies: Arturo Scotto (2015–2017),  (2017–2018), Nicola Fratoianni (2018–present)
Party Leader in the Senate: Loredana De Petris (2016–2022)

Symbols

References

External links
Official website
Parliamentary group in the Chamber of Deputies – official website 
Website of SI's constituent assembly, Cosmopolitica
Complete recording of the first day of Cosmopolitica from Radio Radicale
Complete recording of the third day of Cosmopolitica from Radio Radicale

2017 establishments in Italy
Democratic socialist parties in Europe
Ecosocialist parties
Green political parties in Italy
Left-wing politics in Italy
Organisations based in Rome
Party of the European Left observer parties
Political parties established in 2017
Socialist parties in Italy